Clifford Allison (October 20, 1964 – August 13, 1992) was an American stock car racing driver. Son of NASCAR champion Bobby Allison, he was a member of the "Alabama Gang". He was killed in a crash during practice for a NASCAR Busch Series race at Michigan International Speedway in 1992.

Life and career
Son of the legendary Bobby Allison, nephew of Donnie and brother to Davey, Clifford Allison was raised in Hueytown, Alabama and was a member of stock car racing's "Alabama Gang".

Allison was seen as "crazy wild" by his relatives, and his brother stated he believed Clifford had the greater talent of the two younger Allisons. After marrying young, he worked in a coal mine in Kentucky for a period in the 1980s, but soon returned to Alabama and shortly after was divorced. He was then briefly crew chief for his father's Busch Series race team before the team was disbanded in 1988. By that time remarried, Allison started his racing career in earnest in the early 1990s, competing in ARCA and NASCAR Busch Series events; he began the 1990 season competing for rookie of the year in the Busch Series, driving for Frank Cicci, but was released after the season's seventh race for poor performances. Allison drove for Clint Folsom on a limited basis in 1991, while in 1992 he joined team owner Barry Owen, intending to run the majority of the series schedule.

Allison's best finish in professional stock car racing came in an ARCA race at Texas World Speedway in April 1992, where he finished second.

Death
During practice for the Detroit Gasket 200, a Busch Series race at Michigan International Speedway in August 1992, Allison spun in turn four, hitting the concrete wall with the driver's side; he died shortly thereafter while in transit to hospital. He was the first of two Allisons to die within the space of eleven months; his brother perished in a helicopter crash at Talladega Superspeedway the following year.

Motorsports career results

NASCAR
(key) (Bold – Pole position awarded by qualifying time. Italics – Pole position earned by points standings or practice time. * – Most laps led.)

Busch Series

References
Citations

Bibliography

External links
 

1964 births
1992 deaths
People from Hueytown, Alabama
Racing drivers from Alabama
NASCAR drivers
ARCA Menards Series drivers
American Speed Association drivers
Sports deaths in Michigan
Racing drivers who died while racing
Alabama Gang
Burials in Alabama